Qəbizdərə (also, Kabizdara, Kabizdere, Kapiadara, and Kapizdara) is a village in the Zaqatala Rayon of Azerbaijan.  The village forms part of the municipality of Mazıx.

References

External links

Populated places in Zaqatala District